In computer science, a single address space operating system (or SASOS) is an operating system that provides only one globally shared address space for all processes. In a single address space operating system, numerically identical (virtual memory) logical addresses in different processes all refer to exactly the same byte of data.

Single address-space operating systems offer certain advantages. In a traditional OS with private per-process address space, memory protection is based on address space boundaries ("address space isolation"). Single address-space operating systems use a different approach for memory protection that is just as strong. One advantage is that the same virtual-to-physical map page table can be used with every process (and in some SASOS, the kernel as well). This makes context switches on a SASOS faster than on operating systems that must change the page table and flush the TLB caches on every context switch.

SASOS projects include the following:
 Amiga family – AmigaOS, AROS and MorphOS 
 Angel
 BareMetal
 Br1X
 Genera by Symbolics
 IBM i (formerly called OS/400)
 Iguana at NICTA, Australia
 JX a research Java OS
 IncludeOS
 Mungi at NICTA, Australia
 Nemesis
 Opal
 OS-9
 Phantom OS
 RTEMS
 Scout
 Singularity
 Sombrero
 TempleOS
 Theseus OS
 Torsion
 VxWorks
Zephyr

See also 
 Exokernel
Hybrid kernel
Kernel
Microkernel
Nanokernel
Unikernel
Flat memory model
Virtual memory

References

Bibliography 
 . 
 
 
 

Operating systems